Sierra de Santa Cruz is a mountain range in the Campo de Daroca comarca, Aragon, Spain. It is located north of the Laguna de Gallocanta.

Geography
The ridge is aligned in a NW-SE direction. Its highest point is Cerro de Santa Cruz (1,423 m). The Ermita de Santa Cruz shrine is located in the range.

This mountain chain rises west of Daroca and stretches through the municipal terms of Balconchán, Atea, Orcajo, Cubel, Valdehorna, Val de San Martín and Santed.

Ecology
The plant Centaurea pinnata is an endangered species present in this mountain range.

See also
Mountains of Aragon
Campo de Daroca

References

External links

CAI Aragon - Sierra de de Santa Cruz
 Hiking in Sierra de Santa Cruz

Santa Cruz
Mountain ranges of Aragon